Lists of Marvel Cinematic Universe cast members cover cast members of productions by Marvel Cinematic Universe, an American media franchise centered on a series of superhero films. The lists include cast members of feature films, short films, television and digital series.

Feature films
Film actors, cast and characters that have appeared in the Marvel Cinematic Universe films
 The Infinity Saga cast members, cast and characters that have appeared in the Infinity Saga

Short films
One-Shots cast and characters, cast and characters that have appeared in the Marvel One-Shots short films
Team Thor cast and characters, cast and characters that have appeared in the Team Thor short films

Television
 Marvel Television series actors, cast and characters that have appeared in Marvel Television's MCU television series
 Agents of S.H.I.E.L.D. cast and characters, cast and characters that have appeared on the Agents of S.H.I.E.L.D. television series
 Agent Carter cast and characters, cast and characters that have appeared on the Agent Carter television series
 Inhumans cast and characters, cast and characters that have appeared on the Inhumans television series
 Daredevil cast and characters, cast and characters that have appeared on the Daredevil television series
 Jessica Jones cast and characters, cast and characters that have appeared on the Jessica Jones television series
 Luke Cage cast and characters, cast and characters that have appeared on the Luke Cage television series
 Iron Fist cast and characters, cast and characters that have appeared on the Iron Fist television series
 The Defenders cast and characters, cast and characters that have appeared on The Defenders television miniseries
 The Punisher cast and characters, cast and characters that have appeared on The Punisher television series
 Runaways cast and characters, cast and characters that have appeared on the Runaways television series
 Cloak & Dagger cast and characters, cast and characters that have appeared on the Cloak & Dagger television series
 Helstrom cast and characters, cast and characters that have appeared on the Helstrom television series
 Marvel Studios television series actors, cast and characters that have appeared in Marvel Studios' MCU television series and specials
 WandaVision cast and characters, cast and characters that have appeared on the WandaVision television series
 The Falcon and the Winter Soldier cast and characters, cast and characters that have appeared on The Falcon and the Winter Soldier television series
 Loki cast and characters, cast and characters that have appeared on the Loki television series
 What If...? cast and characters, cast and characters that have appeared on the What If...? television series
 Hawkeye cast and characters, cast and characters that have appeared on the Hawkeye television series
 Moon Knight cast and characters, cast and characters that have appeared on the Moon Knight television series
 Ms. Marvel cast and characters, cast and characters that have appeared on the Ms. Marvel television series
 She-Hulk: Attorney at Law cast and characters, cast and characters that have appeared on the She-Hulk: Attorney at Law television series
 Werewolf by Night cast and characters, cast and characters that appeared on the Werewolf by Night television special
 The Guardians of the Galaxy Holiday Special cast and characters, cast and characters that appeared on The Guardians of the Galaxy Holiday Special
 For unproduced television series, see:
 Marvel's Most Wanted cast and characters, cast and characters that would have appeared on the Marvel's Most Wanted pilot
 New Warriors cast and characters, cast and characters that would have appeared on the New Warriors pilot

Digital series
 WHIH Newsfront cast and characters, cast and characters that have appeared on the viral marketing WHIH Newsfront digital series
 Agents of S.H.I.E.L.D.: Slingshot cast and characters, cast and characters that have appeared on the Agents of S.H.I.E.L.D.: Slingshot digital series

See also
 Characters of the Marvel Cinematic Universe

Lists of actors by film series
Cast